The Tulsa Golden Hurricane  women's basketball team represents the University of Tulsa in women's basketball. The school competes in the American Athletic Conference in Division I of the National Collegiate Athletic Association (NCAA). The Golden Hurricane play home basketball games at the Reynolds Center in Tulsa, Oklahoma.

History
The Tulsa women's basketball program was discontinued in 1987 and was reinstated in 1996.

As of the 2015–16 season, the Golden Hurricane have a 316–523 record in 31 seasons of play. They have made appearances in the NCAA Tournament in 2006 and 2013, with a win in the First Round in 2006 before a Second Round loss. They have made three appearances in the WNIT (2004, 2005, and 2015), with an appearance in the Second Round in the latter year.

Season-by-season record

NCAA tournament results

References

External links